Zlatko Daskalovski (Macedonian: Златко Даскаловски) (born 8 December 1984) is a Macedonian handball player who plays for RK Golden Art and for the Macedonian national team.

He represented Macedonia at the 2019 World Men's Handball Championship.

References

Living people
1984 births
Macedonian male handball players
Sportspeople from Struga
Macedonian expatriate sportspeople in Montenegro
Macedonian expatriate sportspeople in Turkey
Macedonian expatriate sportspeople in Romania
Expatriate handball players in Turkey 
RK Vardar players